The lac des Joncs is a small mountain lake located in Les Paccots, canton of Fribourg, in Switzerland.

Geography 

It's situated at an elevation of 1,235 m above sea level. The maximum depth of the lake is approximatively 20 meters. The lake is more than 5,000 years old.

Fauna and flora 

The lac des Joncs is a protected site registered on the Swiss Federal Inventory of Amphibian Spawning Areas.  A path leads along the lake and one can learn about the specific fauna and flora of the lake on educational boards.

It's one of the four places in Switzerland where it's possible to spot the dwarf water lily.

To help protect the fragile environment of the lake and for safety reasons, swimming, boating, or diving is not allowed.

See also 
 Les Paccots

References

External links 
 The Lac des Joncs on myswitzerland.com
 The Lac des Joncs on Les Paccots tourism office

Joncs
Joncs
Joncs